There are at least 7 named lakes and reservoirs in Judith Basin County, Montana.

Lakes
 Ackley Lake, el. 
 Hidden Lake, el. 
 Lake Elva, el. 
 Red Shed Lake, el. 
 Rhoda Lake, el. 
 Twin Lakes, el.

Reservoirs
 Ackley Lake, el.

See also
 List of lakes in Montana

Notes

Bodies of water of Judith Basin County, Montana
Judith